The 1963 FIBA European Championship, commonly called FIBA EuroBasket 1963, was the thirteenth FIBA EuroBasket regional basketball championship, held by FIBA Europe. Sixteen national teams affiliated with the International Basketball Federation (FIBA) entered the competition. The tournament was hosted by Poland, and held in Wrocław.

First round

Group A

Group B

Knockout stage

13th–16th place playoffs

13th–16th place playoffs

15th place playoffs

13th place playoffs

9th–12th place playoffs

9th-12th place playoffs

11th place playoffs

9th place playoffs

5th–8th place playoffs

5th-8th place playoffs

7th place playoffs

5th place playoffs

Final round

Semifinals

Bronze medal match

Final

Final standings

Awards

Team rosters
1. Soviet Union: Jānis Krūmiņš, Gennadi Volnov, Jaak Lipso, Armenak Alachachian, Guram Minashvili, Tõnno Lepmets, Juris Kalnins, Aleksander Travin, Aleksander Petrov, Viacheslav Khrinin, Vadim Gladun, Olgerts Jurgensons (Coach: Alexander Gomelsky)

2. Poland: Mieczysław Łopatka, Bohdan Likszo, Janusz Wichowski, Andrzej Pstrokonski, Leszek Arent, Zbigniew Dregier, Kazimierz Frelkiewicz, Wieslaw Langiewicz, Andrzej Nartowski, Stanislaw Olejniczak, Jerzy Piskun, Krzysztof Sitkowski (Coach: Witold Zagórski)

3. Yugoslavia: Radivoj Korać, Ivo Daneu, Trajko Rajković, Slobodan Gordić, Borut Bassin, Nemanja Đurić, Miodrag Nikolić, Miloš Bojović, Živko Kasun, Emil Logar, Zvonko Petričević, Dragoslav Ražnatović (Coach: Aleksandar Nikolić)

4. Hungary: János Greminger, Laszlo Gabanyi, János Simon, Janos Bencze, Miklos Bohaty, Gyorgy Polik, Gyorgy Vajdovics, Jozsef Prieszol, Arpad Glatz, Tibor Kangyal, Otto Temesvari, Pal Koczka (Coach: Tibor Zsiros)

References

External links

FIBA Europe EuroBasket 1963

1963
Euro
1963 in Polish sport
Basketball
Sport in Wrocław
October 1963 sports events in Europe